Igor Kudelin (born August 8, 1972) is a Russian former professional basketball player. A 1.95 tall shooting guard, he spent the major part of his career playing for CSKA Moscow. He helped his team reach the Euroleague Final Four twice, in 1996 and 2001.

Kudelin was a regular member of the Russian national team. With Russia he won a silver medal at the 1998 FIBA World Championship as well as a bronze medal at the 1997 Eurobasket.

External links 
Fibaeurope.com Profile

1972 births
Living people
Sportspeople from Taganrog
Russian men's basketball players
Soviet men's basketball players
PBC CSKA Moscow players
BC UNICS players
Shooting guards
2002 FIBA World Championship players
1998 FIBA World Championship players